Mudpie or mud pie can refer to:

 Mississippi mud pie, a type of dessert
 Mud pie, a non-edible "pie" made of mud made by children for fun
 The code name of the game Uru: Ages Beyond Myst

See also

Dorodango, a Japanese art form in which earth and water are molded to create a delicate shiny sphere.